SoundTracker is a free tracker for Unix-like operating systems running X Window System for composing music to be saved in module files.

Description 
Its name is a tribute to the 1987 Amiga program Ultimate Soundtracker which is regarded as the first program of this type, while its user interface mostly resembles and indeed functionally mimics Fast Tracker, one of many popular MS-DOS-based audio trackers, supporting saving in its file formats. It generally renders playback using the OpenCP (à la Cubic Player) engine. Initially SoundTracker had used GTK+ (version 1) as its widget toolkit, modern versions (since 1.0.0) use GTK+ 2. For many years, SoundTracker was one of the very few mature audio trackers available for Unix-like operating systems.

References

 Dee-Ann LeBlanc, Andrew J.D. Bowman, (August 9, 2002) Building Sounds for your Applications with SoundTracker, LinuxPlanet
 David Phillips, (January 1, 2001) A Profile of SoundTracker, Linux Journal

External links

Official website

Audio trackers
Free audio software
Audio editing software that uses GTK